Carambolim is a village in North Goa district, Goa, India.

Geography
It is located at an elevation of 5 m above MSL.

Location
The railway station at Carambolim (Karmali) falls under the jurisdiction of the Konkan Railway.

References

External links

 Satellite map of Karmali
 About Karmali

Villages in North Goa district